Estadio Carlos Vega Villalba, formerly known as the Estadio Francisco Villa is a multi-use stadium in Zacatecas, Zacatecas, Mexico.  It is used mostly for football matches and is the home stadium for the new Ascenso MX side Mineros de Zacatecas. The stadium has a capacity of 20,068 people.

History
The stadium was opened in 1986 with a game between the Leones Negros UdeG and the South Korea National Team. Leones win 1–0, the next day, Zacatecas State team defeated another time the Asians.

This stadium was originally part of a project to give Zacatecas city a multi-purpose stadium, also a Sports Complex and other venues.

In late 2017, the stadium was expanded from 14000 seats to 20,060 and renamed in honor of football coach Carlos Vega Villalba.

Sports

Regional track and field events and practices.

Football

Villalba has been home for several football teams, the highest level to be played in the Stadium is the Liga de Ascenso, where the Real Sociedad de Zacatecas franchise played nine seasons from 1997 to 2003, reaching the final once in 1997, and Mineros de Zacatecas  currently plays in the second level since 2014, having played the semifinals four times and the final once. Other leagues were the Zacatecan teams played are the third level Liga Premier de México, currently with the UAZ team Tuzos UAZ, runner-up in 2018–19 season, and the Mineros' "farm" team, fifth level Tercera División de México and final matches from amateur leagues in the Zacatecas area are played often.

Villa hosted some friendly matches between Liga MX Teams and an official fixture between Santos Laguna and C.D. Guadalajara in 1996.
Santos Vs Chivas Estadio Francisco Villa

2007: Necaxa 0-0 Saprissa (Costa Rica)
2011: Santos 1-2 Jaguares
2011: Santos 2-1 America
2013: Monterrey 0-1 Jaguares
2018: Guadalajara 0-0 Pachuca (Reinauguration and renaming of the stadium)

Concerts
Miguel Bosé. Alejandro Sanz. Vicente Fernández. Kumbia Kings, Joan Sebastian and Pepe Aguilar are some of the artists who had performed at the Villa.

References

External links

Stadium information

Francisco Villa
Sports venues in Zacatecas
Athletics (track and field) venues in Mexico
Zacatecas City
1986 establishments in Mexico
Sports venues completed in 1986